1993 Hokkaidō earthquake

 1993 Kushiro earthquake
 1993 Okushiri earthquake